Asteriscus may refer to:

 Asteriscus (plant), a genus of flowering plants
 Asteriscus, a component of the otolith, a structure in the inner ear